The 41st running of the Tour of Flanders cycling classic was held on Sunday, 31 March 1957. Belgian rider Fred De Bruyne won the race in the sprint of a ten-man group in Wetteren. 85 of the 174 riders finished.

Route
The race started in Ghent and finished in Wetteren – covering 242 km. The course featured four categorized climbs:
 Kwaremont
 Statieberg
 Berg Ten Stene
 Kloosterstraat (Geraardsbergen)

Results

References

1957
1957 in road cycling
1957 in Belgian sport
1957 Challenge Desgrange-Colombo
March 1957 sports events in Europe